Jennifer Crawford (born July 25, 1964) is an American former rugby union fifteens and sevens player. A former all-time leading Eagles tryscorer at the time of her retirement, Crawford is considered the finest female player produced by North America.

Crawford participated at the Women's Rugby World Cup in 1991, 1994, and 1998. At her last world cup, she captained the Eagles and earned her twentieth cap and she was the team's leading try-scorer. Crawford also led the Berkley All-Blues to nine consecutive USA Rugby National Women's Club championships as a player and assistant coach.

Life 
Crawford graduated from Stanford University.

References

External links 
https://www.usarugby.org/player/jennifer-crawford/
http://blog.atavus.com/paving-the-road-for-women-like-me
http://www.rugbytoday.com/women/down-memory-lane-usa-women-triumph-first-womens-rugby-world-cup-1991
http://www.rugbytoday.com/women/down-memory-lane-usa-women-third-2000-canada-cup

Living people
United States women's international rugby union players
American female rugby union players
Female rugby union players
1964 births
21st-century American women